Exploring Music is an internationally syndicated radio program featuring classical music, with commentary and analysis by host Bill McGlaughlin. It is a daily, one-hour show with a single in-depth theme each week. The show, which debuted in 2003, is produced by WFMT Radio Network. Exploring Music is in many ways the heir to the late Karl Haas' popular long-running show, Adventures in Good Music, expanded and updated for a 21st-century audience.

As of 2013, Exploring Music airs on 55 U.S. radio stations and has over 400,000 live listeners weekly. In Australia, Exploring Music airs on ArtSound FM in Canberra at 9AM, 3MBS at 9 AM, and on 4MBS at 7 PM. The show is also listenable worldwide via on-demand streaming of all its past and current shows.

Program description

Exploring Music delves into a wide variety of topics in classical music, and each five-program, one-week series has a single theme. Weekly themes have included weeklong studies of the music of dozens of composers, explorations of various cultures, styles, forms, and time periods, and dozens of other topics and areas of exploration.

A very small sampling of weekly topics includes such themes as:

Over two dozen classical composers — e.g. Schumann, Bartók, Grieg, Debussy, Vaughan Williams, Stravinsky, and Bernstein — have also had weekly themes devoted exclusively to their lives and music. These programs are intimate biographies which include the composer's early life, education, historical and musical influences, personal life, and emotional and musical development, plus numerous musical pieces each day. Several composers, including Schubert, Brahms, Tchaikovsky, Mahler, Verdi, and Shostakovich, have had a two-week theme devoted to their lives and works. Bach, Mozart, and Beethoven have each had several series centered around their works. Approximately one week per month is devoted to the life and works of a single composer.  

Exploring Music is geared to all ages and to any level of musical knowledge. Host Bill McGlaughlin guides the listener into the music through various means: revealing the stories behind compositions, adding analysis and illustrations at the piano, exploring  the interlocking nature of music and ideas, referencing the historical context of pieces and trends, and also giving his insight as a professional musician, conductor, and composer. 
 
Each week McGlaughlin weaves a deepening narrative around the topic at hand, and aims to make exploring classical music fun. "Drawing people inside the music seems the clue to me," he says. "Human beings are wired for delight when we figure something out." Occasionally music from other genres — such as jazz, ethnic/world music, folk/traditional music, or pop standards — is aired, to liven up the discussion and illustrate points. 

The piano is another tool McGlaughlin frequently employs to get concepts across. Of his original decisions about the show's format, McGlaughlin says, "It’s very hard to talk about music on the radio unless you can hear a sound, so I said I need a piano. Instead of saying 'a minor third,' I can play it. I wanted to make certain that what you could hear was prominent."

Inception and history

In 2002, Steve Robinson, Vice President of WFMT Radio Network, approached Peabody Award-winner Bill McGlaughlin to host a new daily radio show, which would showcase and explicate great works of classical music. McGlaughlin had spent 22 years as host and music director of Saint Paul Sunday, the nationally syndicated weekly chamber music performance and interview show. His credentials also included decades as a professional musician, conductor, and composer. Regarding his choice of McGlaughlin as host, Steve Robinson stated, "As far as I'm concerned, no one can top Bill in the way he conveys his passion for music on the radio." 

Development of the new program was funded by a special grant from the National Endowment for the Arts, in November 2002. The show debuted nationally on October 6, 2003. Exploring Music in essence replaced Karl Haas' long-running show, Adventures in Good Music, since the aging and retired Haas had recorded no new episodes of his show after 2002. When encore broadcasts of Adventures in Good Music ceased entirely on June 29, 2007, Exploring Music gained an even wider national listenership, as it was then scheduled in the retired show's time slot on many radio stations.

In 2013, after repeated requests from listeners and following years of negotiation with recorded-music copyright lawyers, Exploring Music reached ground-breaking legal agreements which allow it to stream any of its past shows on demand from its site.

Popular and critical reception

McGlaughlin's highly informed, yet relatable and enthusiastic presentation has appealed to radio audiences of all ages, including younger listeners. According to Chicago Tribune music critic John von Rhein, "Bill McGlaughlin's folksy but informed manner as host of the popular radio series Exploring Music has pulled thousands of listeners into the classical experience." Executive Producer Steve Robinson reported in 2007:
The e-mail is always over the top. In my 40 years doing classical music radio I've never seen anything like it.... The letters range from a person who had never heard a string quartet before and wanted to know where to buy one, to a listener who graduated from Juilliard and found [Bill's] comments on Ravel to be enlightening! 

As of 2013, Exploring Music had over 400,000 listeners to the live show.

Honors
Host and music director Bill McGlaughlin received the Lifetime Achievement Award in 2004 from Fine Arts Radio International, which stated that, "Exploring Music, with its weekly thematic concept, provides the classical radio listener with both in-depth education and compelling radio listening, a balance that is rarely achieved." 

The show also garnered Bill McGlaughlin and producer Steve Robinson the Dushkin Award from the Music Institute of Chicago, in 2008. 

In 2011, in presenting McGlaughlin their Lifetime Achievement Award, the Association of Music Personnel in Public Radio noted that "Bill McGlaughlin’s incredibly knowledgeable but always inviting and warm presence can ... be heard on Exploring Music, a daily program begun in 2002 in which he guides listeners to discover the heart, soul and humor of the music he plays."

Production and distribution

Since McGlaughlin lives in New York City, and the WFMT production studio is in Chicago, production of Exploring Music occurs in two locations. After choosing a topic, McGlaughlin does extensive research at the Lincoln Center Library for the Performing Arts, and via his own resources such as the 30-volume Grove Dictionary of Music and Musicians. The Chicago producers collect 30 to 50 hours of relevant music selection samples, with their liner notes, from WFMT's extensive library in Chicago, and send them to McGlaughlin — by making low-resolution MP3 files of them, burning them onto DVDs, and FedExing them. In New York, the team at radio station WQXR also combs their music library for more possibilities, and places the audio into iTunes for McGlaughlin to review. 

After sorting through and choosing which music selections to present, and finalizing his research and ideas, McGlaughlin then records the voice-track portion of the week's five one-hour shows, in the studios of WQXR in New York. The recording session is monitored in real time in Chicago via either ISDN or telephone. This allows McGlaughlin, his New York recording engineer, and the Chicago producers to interact freely, as if they were all in the same recording studio. McGlaughlin often voices the same narration section multiple ways, attempting to find the most concise and entertaining way to present the information, which also gives the producers editing options when they finalize each show. 

The voice-track audio files for the week's five shows are then sent to Chicago, where they are edited for time, and the high-resolution music selections are added in. This post-production process involves making artistic choices regarding which of Bill's narration samples to use, and how to present and place Bill's piano examples, snippet examples from CDs, and the musical pieces themselves. Choices are also made with timing in mind; extra movements or an extra unannounced musical snippet at the end of the show are added if a show runs short.

Once each program is completed, a CD is made and given to the WFMT uplink department. The show is then distributed to radio stations around the country three ways: Physical duplicates are made of the master CD and shipped and the show is uploaded to the Public Radio Exchange (PRX) server for automatic internet distribution. Listeners nationwide and even worldwide are then able to hear Exploring Music, either broadcast on their local radio station, or via the internet through any one of over 30 online radio stations.

Listening options

Exploring Music airs daily on 55 public and commercial radio stations in the U.S.  In Australia, Exploring Music airs on 3MBS at 9 AM, and on 4MBS at 7 PM; in Guam it airs on KPRG at 10 AM.

As of May 2013, Exploring Music also offers the option to stream any of its past and current programs on demand on its website. The on-demand archive includes a search function which can search for terms and names throughout all series and episodes, and also includes a feature which can separate the music from an episode from McGlaughlin's commentary and vice versa.

Playlists for every episode of Exploring Music since its inception are available on the program's official site.

Footnotes

External links
Exploring Music Official Site
Station listings
On-Demand Streaming of all past shows
Exploring Music via Streaming Audio
Playlists 2003 to present

American classical music radio programs
American public radio programs
Music education
Music journalism
2003 radio programme debuts